Henry Steinhauer may refer to:
 Henry Bird Steinhauer (1804–1885), Canadian clergyman among the Cree and Ojibwa
 Henry Steinhauer (paleobotanist) (1782–1818), Canadian paleobotanist and paleontologist